Aryob or Aryub is the main town of Zazi District in the Paktia Province of Afghanistan where the Zazi tribe of Pashtuns live.

See also
 Zazi Maidan, town in Khost Province, Afghanistan
 Loya Paktia

References

External links
 

Populated places in Paktia Province